The Captain Cook Monument is a life-size bronze statue of Captain James Cook installed in Anchorage, Alaska's Resolution Park.

History
During the third voyage of James Cook to discover the Northwest Passage, much of what would later be named the Cook Inlet was explored in 1778 by HMS Resolution. In 1976, a statue of James Cook created by Derek Freeborn was installed in Resolution Park in Downtown Anchorage. The statue is a replica of one in the city's sister city, Whitby, England, and was donated by British Petroleum to commemorate the United States Bicentennial.

In 2008, the statue appeared on the finale of The Amazing Race 12.

In the aftermath of the murder of George Floyd, some residents sought the removal of the statue due to Cook's links to colonialism and exploitation of Indigenous people. On June 25, 2020, Anchorage Mayor Ethan Berkowitz stated that the native village of Eklutna would determine the monument's fate.

References

Buildings and structures in Anchorage, Alaska
Cultural depictions of James Cook
Monuments and memorials in Alaska
Monuments and memorials to James Cook
Outdoor sculptures in Alaska
Sculptures of men in the United States
Statues in Alaska